Cleopatra (69–30 BC) was the last active Ptolemaic ruler of Egypt before it became a Roman province.

Cleopatra may also refer to: for

Given name 
From the Greek name Κλεοπάτρα (Kleopatra) meaning "glory of the father", derived from κλέος (kleos) meaning "glory" combined with πατήρ (pater) meaning "father" (genitive πατρός). 
 Cleopatra (given name), a list of people and fictional characters
 Cleopatra (Greek singer) (born 1963), represented Greece in the 1992 Eurovision Song Contest
 Cleopatra (Greek myth), a list of mythological figures

Film 
 Cleopatra (1912 film), silent film by Helen Gardner
 Cleopatra (1917 film), American film by J. Gordon Edwards
 Cleopatra (1928 film), short film
 Cleopatra (1934 film), American film by Cecil B. DeMille
 Cleopatra (1963 film), American film by Joseph L. Mankiewicz
 Cleopatra (1970 film), Japanese anime film
 Cleopatra (2003 film), Argentine film by Eduardo Mignogna
 Cleopatra (2005 film), South Indian Tamil film
 Cleopatra (2007 film), Brazilian film by Júlio Bressane
 Cleopatra (2013 film), South Indian Malayalam film

Literature
 Cleopatra (Rider Haggard novel) (1889)
 Cleopatra (Gardner novel), a 1962 novel Jeffrey K. Gardner
 La Cleopatra (poem), an epic poem by Girolamo Graziani
 the title character of Cleopatra in Space, an American graphic novel series for children by Mike Maihack

Music

Classical music
 Cleopatra (Cimarosa), a 1789 opera seria by Domenico Cimarosa
 Cleopatra (Rossi), an 1876 opera by Lauro Rossi
 Cleopatra, an opera by Johann Mattheson
 Cleopatra, a composition by Luigi Mancinelli
 Cleopatra, a symphonic poem by George Whitefield Chadwick

Popular music
 Cleopatra Records, an American record label
 Cleopatra (group), a British girl group

Albums
 Cleopatra (album), a 2016 album by The Lumineers
 Cleopatra (1963 soundtrack), a soundtrack by Alex North
 Cleopatra, a 2004 album by Isabel Bayrakdarian
 Handel: Cleopatra, a 2011 album by Natalie Dessay

Songs
 "Cleopatra" (Frankie Avalon song) (1963)
 "Cleopatra" (Jerome Kern song) (1917)
 "Cleopatra" (Samira Efendi song), Azerbaijan's 2020 Eurovision song submission.
 "Cleopatra" (The Lumineers song) (2016)
 "Cleopatra" (Weezer song) (2014)
 "Cleopatra (I've Got to Get You Off My Mind)", a song by  The Tennors
 "Cleopatra", a song by Adam and the Ants from their 1979 album Dirk Wears White Sox
 "Cleopatra", a song by Nico Fidenco
 "Cleopatra", a song by David Vendetta

Paintings
 Cleopatra (Artemisia Gentileschi, Ferrara), by Artemisia Gentileschi, c. 1620
 Cleopatra (Artemisia Gentileschi, Milan), by Artemisia Gentileschi, 1613 or 1621–1622
 Cleopatra (Artemisia Gentileschi, Rome), by Artemisia Gentileschi, c. 1633-5

Places
 Cleopatra (neighborhood), a neighborhood of Alexandria, Egypt
 Cleopatra, Kentucky, United States, an unincorporated community
 Cleopatra, Missouri, United States, an unincorporated community
 Cleopatra (crater), an impact crater on Venus

Plants and animals
 Cleopatra (horse), an American racehorse
 Cleopatra (gastropod), a genus of freshwater snails
 Gonepteryx cleopatra or cleopatra, a species of butterfly
 Neoguillauminia cleopatra, a species of tree from New Caledonia

Ships 
 , various Royal Navy ships
 , an East India Company paddle frigate built in 1839 and sunk by a tropical cyclone in 1847
 Cleopatra (cylinder ship), a vessel constructed to convey Cleopatra's Needle from Alexandria to London in 1877
 , originally named Cleopatra, a mixed passenger liner and animal carrier which sank in 1898
 , a World War II Victory cargo ship renamed Cleopatra in 1956

Television 
 Cleopatra (miniseries), a 1999 American miniseries produced by Hallmark Entertainment
 Cleopatra 2525, an American science fiction television series
 The Cleopatras, a 1983 British series
 Cleopatra in Space, an animated television series from DreamWorks Animation Television

Other uses
 Cleopatra (cigarette), an Egyptian brand

See also 
 Foxxy Cleopatra, a character in Austin Powers in Goldmember
 Cleopatra Algemene Studentenvereniging Groningen, a student association in Groningen, the Netherlands
 Cleopatra's Needle, a pair of Egyptian obelisks
 Kleopatra (disambiguation)
 Cleo (disambiguation)